The Bartell Drug Company, commonly known as Bartell Drugs and referred to by locals as simply "Bartell's", is a chain of pharmacies in the Puget Sound area of Washington state. Bartell Drug stores primarily serve the Seattle area. Bartell's was believed to be the nation's oldest existing family-owned drugstore chain until it was sold to Rite Aid in 2020.

1890 to 1956
Bartell Drugs was founded in 1890 when George H. Bartell Sr. (1868–1956) purchased the Lake Washington Pharmacy at 2711 South Jackson Street in Seattle's Central District. Within eight years a second store was opened in 1898 in Downtown Seattle at 506 Second Ave. Two years later, George H. Bartell Sr., sold the Jackson Street store in 1900. Fourteen years after founding the first store George H. Bartell Sr. opened another store at 610 Second Ave in 1904. His third store was opened four years later in 1908 in front of Pike Place Market. In 1911 he closed the downtown store which was opened three years earlier at 506 Second Avenue.

As of 1930 there were 15 total stores. George Sr. handed the reins to his son, George H. Bartell Jr, in 1939. By 1956 the Bartell family owned 23  drug stores; additionally, founder George H. Bartell Sr died the same year.

1956 to 1984

The company underwent contraction over the next few years, with only 12 remaining drug stores in 1961, under the founder's grandson George D. Bartell. In 1966, seventy-six years after the company was founded, a 13th drug store was opened outside of King County in Edmonds, Washington. Over the following fourteen years the Bartell family had opened an additional four stores, totaling 17 Bartell Drug stores by 1980.

1990
Over the following ten years the Bartell family had opened an additional fourteen stores, totaling 31 Bartell Drug stores by the year 1990, Bartell's centennial. One hundred years after being founded, Bartell Drugs finally expanded outside of the King County Seattle area by opening a Bartell Drug store in Gig Harbor, Pierce County, on the Kitsap Peninsula in 1991. Joining the company in 1993 was Jean Bartell Barber, the founder's granddaughter.

2000 and beyond
George D. Bartell, the founder's grandson served as Chairman and held the role of CEO until 2015. Former REI executive Brian Unmacht became the first non-family member CEO in the company's history in April 2015, with Jean Bartell Barber, serving as Vice Chairman and Treasurer. Unmacht, originally hired in January 2015, as President, resigned in March 2017 after two years.

In January 2018, Bartell Drugs announced that it had hired a new CEO, Kathi Lentzsch. 

In addition to pharmaceuticals, Bartell Drugs began selling CBD in 2018. As of February 2019 there were 68 stores in the Puget Sound region; each location features its own distinct neighborhood vibe and products. 

On October 7, 2020, the company announced that it would be sold to Pennsylvania-based Rite Aid for $95 million. The acquisition was completed on December 18.

Legacy and influence
In December 2004 Harvey Danger, an alternative rock band from Seattle, released the EP Sometimes You Have to Work on Christmas (Sometimes), which mentions Bartell Drugs in the second verse.

References

External links
 
 Metropolis 7 - Bartell Drugs Advertising agency discusses the advertisements that it created for Bartell Drugs

American companies established in 1890
1890 establishments in Washington (state)
Pharmacies of the United States
Companies based in Seattle
Retail companies established in 1890
Health care companies based in Washington (state)
2020 mergers and acquisitions
Rite Aid